Magrahat Purba Assembly constituency is a Legislative Assembly constituency of South 24 Parganas district in the Indian State of West Bengal. It is reserved for Scheduled Castes.

Overview
As per order of the Delimitation Commission in respect of the Delimitation of constituencies in the West Bengal, Magrahat Purba Assembly constituency is composed of the following:
 Magrahat II community development block

Magrahat Purba Assembly constituency is a part of No. 19 Jaynagar (Lok Sabha constituency).

Members of Legislative Assembly

Election Results

Legislative Assembly Election 2011

Legislative Assembly Elections 1977-2006
In 2006 and 2001, Bansari Mohan Kanji of CPI(M) won the Magrahat Purba Assembly constituency defeating his nearest rival Namita Saha of AITC. Nirmal Sinha of CPI(M) defeated Namita Saha of INC in 1996 and 1991. Radhika Ranjan Pramanik of CPI(M) defeated Manoranjan Halder of INC in 1987, Nirmal Kanti Mondal of INC in 1982 and Manoranjan Halder of INC in 1977.

Legislative Assembly Elections 1952-1972
Manoranjan Halder of INC won in 1972. Radhika Ranjan Pramanik of CPI(M) won in 1971, 1969 and 1967. Ardhendu Sekhar Naskar of INC won in 1962. In 1957 and 1952, Magrahat Assembly constituency had joint seats. In 1957, Abdul Hashem and Ardhendu Sekhar Naskar, both of INC, won. In 1952, Abdul Hashem and Ardhendu Sekhar Naskar, both of INC, won.

References

Notes

Citations

Assembly constituencies of West Bengal
Politics of South 24 Parganas district